Bosemprella is a genus of bivalves belonging to the family Tellinidae.

The species of this genus are found in Western Europe and Mediterranean.

Species:

Bosemprella aquitanica 
Bosemprella incarnata

References

Bivalves